The Manor of Clovelly is a historic manor in North Devon, England. Within the manor are situated the manor house known as Clovelly Court, the parish church of All Saints, and the famous picturesque fishing village of Clovelly. The parish church is unusually well-filled with well-preserved monuments to the lords of the manor, of the families of Cary, Hamlyn, Fane, Manners and Asquith. In 2015 the Rous family, direct descendants via several female lines of Zachary Hamlyn (1677–1759) the only purchaser of Clovelly since the 14th century, still own the estate or former manor, amounting to about 2,000 acres, including Clovelly Court and the advowson of the parish church, and the village of Clovelly, run as a major tourist attraction with annual paying visitor numbers of about 200,000.

Descent

Normans

Brictric/Queen Matilda
The manor of CLOVELIE  was recorded in the Domesday Book of 1086 as held at some time in chief from William the Conqueror by the great Saxon nobleman Brictric, but later held by the king's wife Matilda of Flanders (c. 1031 – 1083).

According to the account by the Continuator of Wace and others, in his youth Brictric declined the romantic advances of Matilda and his great fiefdom was thereupon seized by her. Whatever the truth of the matter, years later when she was acting as Regent in England for William the Conqueror, she used her authority to confiscate Brictric's lands and threw him into prison, where he died. Most of Matilda's landholdings, including Clovelly, descended to the Honour of Gloucester.

Feudal barony of Gloucester

Brictric's lands were granted after the death of Matilda in 1083 by her eldest son King William Rufus (1087–1100) to Robert FitzHamon (died 1107), the conqueror of Glamorgan, whose daughter and sole heiress Maud (or Mabel) FitzHamon brought them to her husband Robert de Caen, 1st Earl of Gloucester (pre-1100-1147), a natural son of Matilda's younger son King Henry I (1100–1135). Thus Brictric's fiefdom became the feudal barony of Gloucester. The Giffard family later held Clovelly as feudal tenant of the Honour of Gloucester, and the Book of Fees records Roger Giffard holding Clovelly "from the part of Earl Richard", that is Richard de Clare, 5th Earl of Hertford, 6th Earl of Gloucester (1222–1262), feudal baron of Gloucester. The  feudal barony of Gloucester was soon absorbed into the Crown, when the Giffards became tenants in chief.

Giffard

Roger Giffard in 1242 held Clovelly as one knight's fee from Sir Walter Giffard of Weare Giffard. 
His son Matthew Giffard, tempore King Edward I (1272–1307), left two daughters and co-heiresses, one married to Stanton, the other to Mandevile. Matthew Giffard presumably died before 1314 as in that year Clovelly was held jointly by John de Stanton and John Maundeville. In 1345 Clovelly was held by Sir John de Stanton and Robert Mandevill. It appears that on an eventual split of the Giffard estates Mandeville inherited Fonthill Gifford in Wiltshire whilst Stanton received Clovelly. John de Stanton left a daughter and sole heiress Matilde de Stanton, wife of John Crewkern of Childhey in Dorset. During the reign of King Richard II (1377–1399) Clovelly was sold to Sir John Cary (died 1395), as is generally accepted, although the Devon historian Thomas Westcote (d. circa 1637) in his View of Devonshire suggested that the latter inherited it from his mother Margaret Bozum, daughter of Richard Bozum apparently of the family seated at Bozum's Hele, in the parish if Dittisham, Devon.

Cary

In the 14th century, Clovely is found held by the Cary family:

Sir John Cary (died 1395)
Sir John Cary (died 1395), who purchased the manor of Clovelly, but probably never lived there and certainly died in exile in Ireland. He was a judge who rose to the position of Chief Baron of the Exchequer (1386-8) and served twice as Member of Parliament for Devon, on both occasions together with his brother Sir William Cary, in 1363/4 and 1368/9. He was a son of Sir John Cary, Knight, by his second wife Jane de Brian, a daughter and co-heiress of Sir Guy de Brian (died 1349) (alias de Brienne), of Walwyn's Castle in Pembrokeshire and Torr Bryan, on the south coast of Devon, and sister of Guy de Bryan, 1st Baron Bryan, KG (died 1390). He married Margaret Holleway, daughter and heiress of Robert Holleway.

Sir Robert Cary (died c. 1431)
Sir Robert Cary (died c. 1431) (eldest son and heir) of Cockington, Devon, 12 times MP for Devon. At some time after 1350 the Cary family acquired the manor of Cockington, in Devon, which they made their principal seat. Certainly according to Pole, Robert Cary held Cockington during the reign of King Henry IV (1399–1413). He was an esquire in the households of King Richard II (1377–1399) and of the latter's half-brother John Holland, 1st Duke of Exeter (c. 1352 – 1400). He married as his first wife  Margaret Courtenay, a daughter of Sir Philip Courtenay (1340–1406), of Powderham, Devon, 4th (or 5th or 6th) son of Hugh Courtenay, 2nd Earl of Devon (1303–1377) by his wife Margaret de Bohun (died 1391), daughter and heiress of Humphrey de Bohun, 4th Earl of Hereford (1298–1322) by his wife Elizabeth Plantagenet, a daughter of King Edward I. Her eldest brother was Richard Courtenay (died 1415), Bishop of Norwich, a close friend and ally of Henry of Monmouth, later King Henry V (1413–1422), who did much to restore Robert Cary to royal favour after his father's attainder.

Sir Philip Cary (died 1437)
Sir Philip Cary (died 1437), of Cockington, eldest son and heir, by his father's first wife. He was MP for Devon in 1433. He married Christiana de Orchard (died 1472), daughter and heiress of William de Orchard of Orchard (later Orchard Portman), near Taunton in Somerset.

Sir William Cary (1437–1471)

Sir William Cary (1437–1471), of Cockington, son and heir. He was beheaded after the defeat of the Lancastrians at the Battle of Tewkesbury in 1471. He is believed to be represented by a monumental brass of a knight, without surviving identifying inscription, set into a slate ledger stone on the floor of the chancel of All Saints Church, Clovelly, next to a smaller brass, in similar style, of his son and heir Robert Cary (died 1540). He married twice:
Firstly to Elizabeth Poulett, a daughter of Sir William Poulett of Hinton St George, Somerset (ancestor of Earl Poulett), by whom he had children:
Robert Cary (died 1540), of Cockington, son and heir
Secondly he married Anna (or Alice) Fulford, a daughter of Sir Baldwin Fulford (died 1476) of Fulford, Devon, by whom he had children:
Thomas Cary of Chilton Foliat, Wiltshire, who married Margaret Spencer (1472–1536), (or Eleanor Spencer), one of the two daughters and co-heiresses of Sir Robert Spencer (d. circa 1510), "of Spencer Combe", in the parish of Crediton in Devon, by his wife  Eleanor Beaufort (1431–1501), daughter of Edmund Beaufort, 2nd Duke of Somerset (1406–1455), KG. By Margaret Spencer he had two sons:
Sir John Cary (1491–1552) of Pleshey in Essex, eldest son, ancestor to the Cary Viscounts Falkland.
William Cary, her 2nd son, the first husband of Mary Boleyn, sister of Queen Anne Boleyn, and ancestor to the Cary Barons Hunsdon, Barons Cary of Leppington, Earls of Monmouth, Viscounts Rochford and Earls of Dover.

Robert Cary (died 1540)

Robert Cary (died 1540), of Cockington and Clovelly, son and heir by first wife. His monumental brass  showing a bare-headed knight dressed in full armour and standing in prayer, survives with its inscription, set into a ledger stone on the floor of the chancel of All Saints Church, Clovelly, inscribed as follows:
Praye for the soule of Master Robert Cary Esquier sonne & heyer of Sur Will'm Cary, Knyght, whiche Robert decessyd the XVth day of June i(n) the yere of o(u)r Lord God MVCXL o(n) whos sowle J(es)hu have m(er)cy

He married three times:
Firstly to Jane Carew, daughter of Nicholas Carew, Baron Carew (1424–1471), of Mohuns Ottery, Luppitt, Devon, by whom he had two sons:
John Cary (born 1502), eldest son and heir, who inherited the manor of Cary.
Thomas Cary (died 1567), 2nd son, who inherited Cockington.
Secondly to Ames Hody (alias Huddye), daughter of Sir William Hody, Lord Chief Baron of the Exchequer 1486–1512, by whom he had a son:
William Cary (died 1550) of Ladford
Thirdly to Margaret Fulkeram (died 1547), daughter and heiress of William Fulkeram of Dartmouth, Devon. A branch of the Fulkeram family (alias Fookeray, Fokeray, etc.,) were lords of the manor of Buckland Baron (Buckland-in-the-Moor) in Haytor Hundred. by Margaret Fulkeram he had issue:
Robert Cary (died 1586) of Clovelly (4th son).

Robert Cary (died 1586)

Robert Cary (died 1586) of Clovelly, 4th son of his father, by his 3rd wife. He was given Clovelly by his father. He was the first Cary to be seated exclusively at Clovelly, the manors of Cary and Cockington having been inherited by his half-brothers. He was Member of Parliament for Barnstaple, Devon, in October 1553 and served as Sheriff of Devon in 1555–56. He served as Recorder of Barnstaple after 1560. He was a magistrate and along with several other members of the Devonshire gentry then serving as magistrates he died of gaol fever at the Black Assize of Exeter 1586. He married Margaret Milliton, daughter of John Milliton and widow of John Giffard of Yeo in the parish of Alwington, North Devon. His large monument, with strapwork decoration, survives against the south wall of the chancel of All Saints Church, Clovelly. Along the full length of the cornice is inscribed in gilt capitals: Robertus Carius, Armiger, obiit An(no) Do(mini) 1586 ("Robert Cary, Esquire, died in the year of Our Lord 1586"). On the base of the north side are shown two relief sculpted heraldic escutcheons, showing Cary impaling Chequy argent and sable, a fess vairy argent and gules (Fulkeram, for his father) and Cary impaling  Sable, three swords pilewise points in base proper pomels and hilts or (Poulett, for his grandfather). On the base of the west side is a similar escutcheon showing his own arms of Cary (of four quarters, 1st: Cary; 2nd: Or, three piles in point azure (Bryan); 3rd: Gules, a fess between three crescents argent (Holleway); 4th: A chevron (unknown, possibly Hankford: Sable, a chevron barry nebuly argent and gules) impaling Gules, a chevron or between three millets hauriant argent (Milliton)

George Cary (1543–1601)

George Cary (1543–1601), eldest son and heir, Sheriff of Devon in 1587. He constructed at Clovelly a harbour wall, surviving today, described by Risdon as "a pile to resist the inrushing of the sea's violent breach, that ships and boats may with the more safety harbour there". Clovelly's main export product was herring fish, which formerly appeared at certain times of the year in huge shoals, close off-shore in the shallow waters of the Bristol Channel, and such a harbour wall was a great benefit to the village fishermen, tenants of the Cary lords of the manor. He married three times:
Firstly to Christiana Stretchley, daughter and heiress of William Stretchley of Ermington in Devon and widow of Sir Christopher Chudleigh (1528–1570) of Ashton, by whom he had issue including:
William Cary (1576–1652) of Clovelly, JP, eldest son and heir.
Secondly to Elizabeth Bampfield, eldest daughter of Richard Bampfield (1526–1594) of Poltimore, Devon, Sheriff of Devon in 1576; without issue.
Thirdly in 1586 to Catherine Russell (died 1632), of Sussex, by whom he had 3 sons and 3 daughters.

His monumental brass survives in Clovelly Church in the form of a ledger stone on the floor of the chancel, inset into which is an inscribed  brass tablet and below which in the 1860s was  added into an empty matrix a reproduction large monumental brass in the form of a bishop's crozier. It is unclear what relevance such an object might have to him and when the original brass which once filled the matrix was removed or robbed. The Latin inscription is as follows:
Epithaphium inditum viri insignissimi curatoris pacis & qui(eti)ssimi et Musar(um) patroni dignissimi Georgii Caret (sic) Armigeri qui obiit decimo die Julii anno Domini 1601. En ubi vir situs est pietate et pace beatus justitiae cultor relligionis amans multorum exemplar, patriae decus, anchora pacis ingenio, forma Pallade, Marte potens. Dum vixit Christum coluit, sic orbe recessit in sancta stabilis relligione Dei. Nunc capit in caelis solatia grata laborum; nunc requiem aeterni carpit in arce poli.
("A funeral oration set in place of a most distinguished man, a most neutral guardian of the peace and a most worthy patron of the Muses, of George Cary, Esquire, who died on the tenth day of July in the year of Our Lord 1601. Behold where is placed a man, blessed with piety and peace, a cultivator of justice, a lover of religion, an example of (for) many, an ornament to his country, in his character an anchor of peace, in his (physical) form like (the Titan) Pallas, powerful in Martial feats. While he lived he worshipped Christ, thus he withdrew from the world firm in the holy religion of God. Now at one time he takes in the Heavens deserved consolation of his labours, at another time he seizes the rest of eternity in the vault of the sky").

William Cary (1576–1652)

William Cary (1576–1652), JP for Devon, MP for Mitchell, Cornwall, in 1604, eldest son and heir by his father's first wife. He is sometimes said to be the model for Will Cary featured in Westward Ho!, the 1855 novel by Charles Kingsley (1819–1875), who appears in the narrative concerning the  Spanish Armada in 1588, although he would have been a boy aged just 12 at the time. However the "daring foreign exploits attributed to him are entirely fictional". Kingsley spent much of his childhood at Clovelly as his father was Rev. Charles Kingsley, Curate of Clovelly 1826-1832 and Rector 1832-1836. Indeed the author's small brass monumental tablet is affixed to the wall of the church under the mural monument of Sir Robert Cary (1610–1675), eldest son of William Cary (1576–1652). He married three times:
Firstly in 1598 to Gertrude Carew (died 1604), widow of John Arundell of Tolverne, Cornwall and daughter of the antiquarian and historian of Cornwall Richard Carew (1556–1620) of Antony in Cornwall, author of the Survey of Cornwall (1602),  Sheriff of Cornwall (1583 and 1586), and MP for Saltash in 1584. Prince relates a "facete fancy" concerning this marriage:
"That her father the morning after, after observing her a little sad, awakened her with this question: 'What! melancholly, daughter, after the next day of your wedding?' 'Yes sir' said she 'and with great reason; for yesterday 'twas care-you, now 'tis care-I' (which is much better in pronouncing than writing), alluding to the change of her name from Carew to Cary".

By Gertrude Carew he had two daughters, Christiana Cary, eldest daughter, wife of Henry Helyar (died 1634) of Coker Court in Somerset, son of Rev. William Helyar (1559–1645), Doctor of Divinity, Archdeacon of Barnstaple and a chaplain to Queen Elizabeth I; and Phillipa Cary (1603–1633), 2nd wife of John Docton (1600–1653) of Docton, in the parish of Hartland, Devon, whose elaborate ledger stone survives in Clovelly Church, showing in the centre the arms of Docton (Per fess gules and argent, two crescents in chief or another in base sable) impaling Cary, and inscribed as follows:
(within a ledger line): "Here lyeth ye body of Phillip ye second daughter of William Cary Esq, wief of John Docton of Docton, Gent., wth whom she lived one yere & had by him on(e) daughter named Phillip & was buried ye 20th of October 1633". (Above an escutcheon): "Aetatis suae 30" (of her age 30) "Dum Spiro Spero". (Verse in the middle of the stone):
She's gon to Heaven yt liv'd on Earth,
A saynt if saynts drawe mortall breath.
Hope was her anchor, faith her sheilde,
Love to the poore ye Elizean Feilde
Through wch shee past unto her rest,
To raigne wth Christ for ever blest.
This way she went, oh hasten on!
While 'tis today ye way she's gon.
Externall bewty let it passe!
What is't but fflesh you se is grasse.

Secondly he married Dorothy Gorges (died 1622), eldest daughter of Sir Edward Gorges of Wraxall, Somerset by his wife Dorothy Speke. Her monument survives in the Speke Chantry in Exeter Cathedral. By Dorothy Gorges he had issue including:
Sir Robert Cary (1610–1675), of Clovelly, eldest son and heir, a Gentleman of the Privy Chamber to King Charles II. He died without children. His mural monument survives in Clovelly Church.
Rev. George Cary (1611–1680), of Clovelly, 2nd son, Dean of Exeter and Rector of Shobrooke in Devon. His mural monument survives in Clovelly Church.
Thirdly in 1631 to Jane Elworthy, widow of Narcissus Mapowder of Holsworthy, Devon.

His mural monument survives on the south chancel wall of Clovelly Church, erected by his 2nd son and eventual heir George (who erected a similar one also opposite on the north chancel wall to his elder brother Sir Robert),  inscribed as follows:
"In memory of William Cary Esqr who served his king and country in ye office of a Justice of Peace under three princes, Q. Elizabeth, King James and King Charles the I and having served his generation dyed in the 76 yeare of his age Ano Dom 1652: Omnis Caro Foenum".

The arms top centre are Cary; the arms top left and right are: Lozengy or and azure, a chevron gules (Gorges (modern)), for his second wife Dorothy Gorges (died 1622), mother of the erector of the monument. These arms were the subject of one of the earliest and most famous heraldic law cases brought concerning English armory, Warbelton v Gorges in 1347. The final sentence in Latin Omnis Caro Foenum, is from Isiah 40:6 ("All flesh is grass") and is a pun on the name Cary, but was commonly used on monuments elsewhere, for example on the monumental brass coffin plate of Richard Duke (1567–1641) of Otterton, in Otterton Church, Devon.

Sir Robert Cary (1610–1675)

Sir Robert Cary (1610–1675), eldest son and heir, a Gentleman of the Privy Chamber to King Charles II. He died unmarried and without children. His mural monument survives in Clovelly Church, erected by his younger brother and heir George Cary (1611–1680) and inscribed as follows:
"In memory of Sr Robert Cary Kt (sonne and heyre of William) Gentleman of the Privy Chamber unto King Charles the 2d who having served faithfully that glorious prince, Charles the Ist, in the long Civil Warr against his rebellious subjects, and both him and his sonne as a Justice of Peace, he dyed a batchelour in the 65 yeare of his age An. Dom. 1675. Peritura Perituris Reliqui".

The last sentence in Latin ("I have left behind those things destined to perish with those people destined to perish") is a reference to Seneca, On Providence. Above are the arms and crest of Cary.

The mural monument in Hartland Church of John Velly (1617-1694), of Higher Velly in the parish of Hartland, about 6 miles west of Clovelly, states that he "faithfully served that glorious prince Charles the Martyr and his son during the late civill wars of England as a captain lewetenant to Sir Rob't Cary".

Dr. George Cary (1611–1680)

Doctor George Cary (1611-1680), younger brother, was a Professor (Doctor) of Divinity, Dean of Exeter (amongst other duties responsible for the maintenance and decoration of the cathedral building) and Rector of Shobrooke in Devon. He was one of the Worthies of Devon of John Prince (died 1723).  He married Anne Hancock, daughter of William Hancock (died 1625), lord of the manor of Combe Martin, Devon, by whom he had numerous children. He was educated at Exeter Grammar School and in 1628 entered The Queen's College, Oxford but later moved to Exeter College, Oxford, much frequented by Devonians. His first clerical appointment was by his father as Rector of Clovelly. Following the Restoration of the Monarchy in 1660, he was appointed Chaplain in Ordinary to King Charles II, after which he received the honour of a Doctorate in Divinity from Oxford University. At the bequest of the Lord Chamberlain he preached a Lent sermon before the king, for which was much thanked by the Archbishop of Canterbury. During most of his career he lived about 44 miles south-east of Clovelly, at Exeter, and at Shobrooke, near Crediton, 9 miles to the north-west of Exeter. Indeed it appears that until about 1702 Clovelly was occupied by his second cousins, the three brothers John Cary, George Cary (died 1702) and Anthony Cary (died 1694), sons of Robert Cary of Yeo Vale, Alwington, near Clovelly. He rebuilt the rectory house at Shobrooke, which he found in a dilapidated state and made it "a commodious and gentile dwelling". He also rebuilt the "ruinous,...filthy and loathsome" Dean's House in Exeter, which during the Civil War had been let to negligent tenants by the See of Exeter, and "in a short time so well repaired, so thoroughly cleansed and so richly furnished this house that it became a fit receptacle for princes". As the Emperor Augustus with the City of Rome, so did Dean Cary with the Dean's House in Exeter "found it ruines but he left it a palace", as Prince suggests. Indeed King Charles II stayed there on the night of 23 July 1670, having visited the newly built Citadel in Plymouth.  It was also the chosen abode of Christopher Monck, 2nd Duke of Albemarle, Lord lieutenant of Devon, for three weeks in 1675 and again during the Monmouth Rebellion. He was a liberal benefactor in assisting the Corporation of Exeter in the completion in 1699 of the cutting of a leat between Exeter Quay and Topsham, which fed into a pool which could shelter 100 ships. He twice refused offers of the Bishopric of Exeter  made by King Charles II, on vacancies arising in 1666 and 1676.  The reason for his first refusal, or profession of Nolo Episcopari, is unknown, but he refused the second time due to age and infirmity which would prevent him attending Parliament as would be required. He died at Shobrooke but was buried in Cloveely Church. His mural monument survives in Clovelly Church, erected by his eldest son Sir George Cary (1654–1685), the armorials of the latter's two wives appearing on the top of the monument as follows: dexter: Azure, a chevron between three mullets pierced or (Davie of Canonteign, Christow); sinister: Or, a lion reguardant sable langued gules (Jenkyn of Cornwall). The Latin inscription is as follows:
Georgius Cary S(acrae) T(heologiae) P(rofessor) Decanus B(eat)i Petri Exon(iensis), vir omnibus dignitatibus major quem ipsa latebra licet ei solum in deliciis non potuit abscondere. Nemo magis invitus cepit nemo magis adornavit cathedram ut lux e tenebris sic illustravit ecclesiam. In omnibus concionibus, hospitiis, conciliis antecelluit. Pectore, lingua calamo, praepotens. In justa causa nemini cedens; in injusta abhorrens lites. Fratribus in ecclesiae negotiis nunquam sese opposuit nisi rationibus et in his semper victor. Erga regem iniquissimis temporibus infractae fidelitatis: post reditum erat ei a sacris. Caelestem vero non aulicam petiit gratiam, quae tamen nolentem sequebatur, nam bis vocante Carolo Secundo, bis humillime respondit: Nolo Episcopari. Obiit die Purificationis B(eatae) Virginis A(nn)o Aet(atis) (suae) 72, A(nn)o Dom(ini) 1680.

Which may be translated as:

"George Cary, Professor of Sacred Theology, Dean of the Blessed St Peter of Exeter, a man greater in all things worthy than concealment allowed to him, ((?)only in delights he was not able to conceal).  No man more against his will took possession of, no man more beautified a cathedral; As light out of shadow, thus he lit up the Church. In all assemblies, guest-chambers and councils he distinguished himself. In his heart, tongue and pen, (he was) exceedingly mighty. In a just cause ceding to no man; in an unjust (cause) abhorring strife. In affairs of business he never opposed  himself to his brothers in the Church, unless for (good) reasons, and in those always the victor. Towards the king in the most evil times (he was) of unbroken fidelity. Afterwards to him was given back ((?)by those things which are holy). Indeed he sought heavenly grace, not grace in the court of kings, which nevertheless against his wishes followed him, for at the two-fold call of Charles II twice he replied in the greatest humility: "I am unwilling to wear the Bishop's Mitre" (lit: "to be bishoped"). He died on the day of the Purification of the Blessed Virgin, in the year of his age 72,(sic) in the year of Our Lord 1680".

Sir George Cary (1654–1685)

Sir George Cary (1654–1685), eldest son and heir. He was knighted by King Charles II during his father's lifetime and in 1681 served as Member of Parliament for Okehampton, Devon, and occupied the honourable position of Recorder of Okehampton.  He married twice as follows, but left no children:
Firstly in 1676 to Elizabeth Jenkyn (1656–1677), daughter and co-heiress (with her sisters Anne Jenkyn, wife of Sir John St Aubyn, 1st Baronet (1645–1687), of Trekenning, MP for Mitchell and Catherine Jenkyn, wife of John Trelawny (c. 1646 – 1680) of Trelawny, MP for West Looe) of James Jenkyn of Trekenning, St. Columb Major, Cornwall. The arms of Jenkyn (Or, a lion reguardant sable langued gules) are shown on the top sinister of the monument Sir George Cary erected to his father in Clovelly Church. By Elizabeth Jenkyn, who died aged 21, he had one son Robert Cary who died an infant. Her mural monument survives in Clovelly Church.
Secondly in 1679 to Martha Davie, daughter and heiress of  William Davie of Canonteign in the parish of Christow, Devon. The arms of Davie of Canonteign (Azure, a chevron between three mullets pierced or) (a variant of Davie of Creedy, Sandford) are shown on the top dexter of the monument Sir George Cary erected to his father in Clovelly Church. Without issue.
His mural monument survives in Clovelly Church, with arms of Cary above, inscribed thus:
"In memory of Sr George Cary Kt sonne and heire of Dr George Cary Dean of Exon who dyed the 6th day of Janry in the 31 year of his age Ano Dom 1684/5. Ne amemines vitam quam si in bonis accenseret numen justis non raperet". (Do not .... life, .... God would not seize away the Just if he had not counted them amongst the Good)

William Cary (c. 1661 – 1710)
 
William Cary (c. 1661 – 1710), younger brother, twice Member of Parliament for Okehampton in Devon 1685-1687 and 1689-1695 and also for Launceston in Cornwall 1695-1710. His mural monument survives in Clovelly Church. In 1704 he obtained a private Act of Parliament to allow him to sell entailed lands in Somerset and to re-settle his Devon estates in order to pay debts and provide incomes for his younger children. He was suffering financial difficulties and applied to Robert Harley for a lucrative government post to restore his finances: 
"...by 16 or 17 years of war my estate, which mostly lies near the sea, has felt more than ordinary calamities of it, and hath been lessened in its income beyond most of my neighbours living in the inland country, and that a considerable jointure upon it, and four small children and the Act of Parliament procured last session for dismembering it, are motives which concur with my ambition to serve her Majesty".
He married twice:

Firstly, after 1683, to Joan Wyndham (1669–1687), a daughter of Sir William Wyndham, 1st Baronet (c. 1632 – 1683) of Orchard Wyndham, Watchet, Somerset, Member of Parliament for Somerset 1656-1658 and for Taunton 1660-1679. She died aged 18 and was buried in the Wyndham Chapel of St Decuman's Church, Watchet, Somerset. Without issue. Her mural monument survives in Clovelly Church, showing at the top the arms of Cary impaling Wyndham: Azure, a chevron between three lion's heads erased or, which arms on escutcheons are also held by a pair of putti below. the monument is inscribed as follows:
"In memory of Joan the wife of William Cary of Clovelly Esqr daughter of Sr William Wyndham of Orchard Wyndham in the county of Somersett, Baronett, who dyed Febry the 4th 86/7 in the 18th year of her age and lys buryed in St Decomans Church Somersett. En forma, moribus, virtutibus vere egregiam! Sed cum egregiam dicimus hic tacemus lugentes (i.e. "Behold! in her appearance, morals and virtues (she was) truly outstanding! But when we say outstanding, here we are silent, lamenting")

Secondly in 1694 to Mary Mansel (died 1701), daughter of Thomas Mansel of Briton Ferry, Glamorgan, MP, and sister of Thomas Mansel, MP. She brought a large dowry of £5,000. her mural monument survives in Clovelly Church inscribed as follows:
"In memory of Mary the wife of William Cary of ys parish, Esqr who was buried the 6th of February 1700. Also in memory of Robert Cary of ys parish Esqr who departd ys life ye 7th of March 1723. Als in memory of Mrs Ann Cary who departd ys life ye 23 of May 1728. This monument was erected by the desire of ye said Mrs Ann Cary and performd by her sister Mrs Elizabeth the last of ye family & now wife to Rob'rt Barber Esq of Ashmore in ye county of Dorset"

By Mary Mansel he had children 3 sons and 2 daughters, which generation was the last of the Cary family of Clovelly:
Robert Cary (1698–1724), eldest son, who died aged 26. His ledger stone slab survives on the floor of the chancel of  Clovelly Church. He is also mentioned on the monument to his mother in Clovelly Church.
William Cary (1698–1724), died aged 26. 
George Cary (1701–1701), 3rd son, died an infant.
Ann Cary (1695–1728), eldest daughter, died unmarried aged 33. Her ledger stone slab survives on the floor of the chancel of  Clovelly Church. She is also mentioned on the monument to her mother in Clovelly Church.
Elizabeth Cary (1699–1738), youngest daughter, wife of Robert Barber (died 1758) of Ashmore in Dorset, by whom she had issue 2 sons and 4 daughters. She was the last of the Carys of Clovelly, which manor was sold in 1739, one year after her death,  to Zachary Hamlyn. Her mural monument, a marble tablet, survives in St Nicholas's Church, Ashmore, (now in the vestry, formerly on the north wall) inscribed as follows:
"In memory of Elizabeth, wife of Robert Barber of Ashmore, in the county of Dorset, Esq., by whom she left two sons, viz. : Robert Cary Barber and Jacob; and four daughters, viz. : Ann, Elizabeth, Lucy and Molly. She was daughter of William Cary of Clovelly, in the county of Devon, Esq. He was member of Parliament for Launceston, in the county of Cornwall. His first wife was Joan, aunt to the present Sir Will. Windham. His second wife Mary, daughter of Thomas Mansell of Britton Ferry, in the county of Glamorgan, Esq., nearly related to Lord Mansell. She was the last of the family of the Carys of Clovelly aforesaid, who descend from the ancient branch of the noble family of which was and are Cary Lord Hunsdon, Cary Lord Faulkland, Cary Lord Lepington and Monmouth, Sir Robert and Sir George Cary. She died in May 1738".

A space is left for the day of her death, which has never been filled in. She was not buried at Ashmore. On the monument are shown the arms of Barber (Argent, two chevrons between three cinquefoils gules) with inescutcheon of pretence of Cary.

Sources
Vivian, Lt.Col. J.L., (Ed.) The Visitations of the County of Devon: Comprising the Heralds' Visitations of 1531, 1564 & 1620, Exeter, 1895, pp. 150–9, pedigree of Cary 
Lauder, Rosemary, Devon Families, Tiverton, 2002, pp. 131–6, Rous of Clovelly
Griggs, William, A Guide to All Saints Church, Clovelly, first published 1980, Revised Version 2010

References

Clovelly